Siahkhani (also Romanized as Sīāhkhānī) is a village in Kanduleh Rural District, Dinavar District, Sahneh County, Kermanshah Province, Iran. At the 2006 census, its population was 179, in 37 families.

References 

Populated places in Sahneh County